The Carnegie Museum of Montgomery County is located in Crawfordsville, Indiana, United States. Opening in 1902, it was the first Carnegie Library in Indiana.  The museum's exhibits focus on the history, art, and culture of Montgomery County. Themes include business & industry; literature & learning; arts & culture; military & democracy; sports & pop culture; topics about Montgomery County; early history; and STEM/STEAM based programs. This site opened as a museum in 2007 under the former curator, Kat Burkhart. 

The mission of the CMMC is to promote public awareness and appreciation of the history, heritage, and culture of Montgomery County through educational programs, public services, collection, exhibition, preservation, and research and documentation. 

History of CMMC 

In order for a community to receive $25,000 from Andrew Carnegie for the library, they had to meet a specific criteria, known as "The Carnegie Formula". (1) Demonstrate the need for a public library. (2) The community must provide a building site. (3) Annually provide 10% of the cost of the libraries construction to support its operation.  

One January 22, 1901, W.F. Hulet, the secretary of the Commercial Club (a local community organization), sent a letter to Andrew Carnegie asking him to help create a new library because the Crawfordsville City Library had become to small to satisfy the needs of the growing community. Mr. Carnegie agreed to help under the stipulation that the site be within a few blocks of the town square. The community gathered at Louis Bischof's Big Store to discuss and vote on a suitable location. They decided on a plot at the corner of Wabash Avenue & Washington Street. The community also supported the annual 10% investment of $2,500 to care for the library's collection and staff. 

The Crawfordsville District Public Library relocated to a new building in 2005 and is across the street from the original Carnegie building. CDPL decided to continue to care for their former site and to create a community-based museum; the Carnegie Museum of Montgomery County. 

More information about this library building is in Mary Johnson's The History of Libraries in Montgomery County.

The Carnegie Museum of Montgomery County (CMMC) is located at 222 S. Washington Street, Crawfordsville, Indiana 47933 and is open to the public free of charge Wednesday through Saturday, 10 a.m. to 5 p.m.

References

External links 
Official website

Library buildings completed in 1902
Museums established in 1902
Carnegie libraries in Indiana
History museums in Indiana
Museums in Montgomery County, Indiana
Former library buildings in the United States
Crawfordsville, Indiana